The BTC-T Peugeot 406 Coupé is a BTC-Touring class racing car that was built for the 2001 British Touring Car Championship season by Vic Lee Racing, who were selected to run Peugeot's official works program for that season.

2001 season
After a successful 2000 BTCC season, having won the driver's championship for Class B, Vic Lee Racing signed a deal with Peugeot to run in the BTC Touring-class for the 2001 BTCC season. VLR built 3 406 Coupes, and hired Dan Eaves, Steve Soper and Matt Neal as their drivers, but sponsorship issues led to releasing Neal after the first round, being replaced by ex-motorcycle racer Aaron Slight in several rounds. Neal would go on to be critical of the Peugeot effort. The campaign was unsuccessful, with the best results being a pair of 3rd places from Eaves, at Oulton Park and the last round of the season, held at the Brands Hatch Indy circuit. The car's large size limited its agility and made it less competitive than its rivals.

2002 season
After the poor performances in 2001, Peugeot withdraw their works support, choosing instead to focus on their more successful World Rally Championship campaign. The team, in 2002, now renamed Team Halfords after gaining sponsorship from Halfords, continued racing with the 406. Eaves stayed with the team, while 1992 champion Tim Harvey and Carl Breeze joined the team. A second unsuccessful season followed; with the only podium finish being a second place from Eaves in the second race of the season. Despite the lack of overall competitiveness, Dan Eaves and Tim Harvey finished the season 1st and 3rd respectively in the Independents Cup. For 2003, the team switched to the Sergio Rinland designed Peugeot 307, with the hope of gaining more competitiveness.

2004 season
The 406 Coupes remained unused in 2003, but halfway through the 2004 season, Mardi Gras Motorsport took the decision to replace their LPG-powered, Super 2000-specification Honda Civic with a 406 Coupe. The car proved barely more successful than its predecessor - finishing no higher than a 12th place at Knockhill in the 4 rounds it entered. The car did not reappear for the 2005 season.

References

British Touring Car Championship
Touring cars
406 Coupe BTC-T
Cars introduced in 2001
Front-wheel-drive vehicles